Ashoke Pandit (born 11 May 1966) is an Indian filmmaker. He currently serves as the president of the Indian Film & Television Directors' Association.

Career 
Pandit began his career acting in plays while attending Narsee Monjee College, Mumbai. After graduating, he continued directing plays at the college, until he was eventually offered a sponsorship from the Indian People's Theatre Association. Pandit worked as an associate director for Raman Kumar, Kundan Shah, and Manjul Sinha, until rising to his own prominence as the producer and director of the comedy TV series Filmi Chakkar. He would later go on to direct the TV shows Tere Mere Sapne and Colgate Top Ten.

In 1999, he won a Radio and TV Advertising Practitioners' Association of India award for best picture for his documentary Sharnarthi Apne Desh Mein, a 40-minute film detailing the plight of Kashmiri Pandit refugees during 1989-1990. In 2010, he released A Village of Windows, a documentary detailing the hardships of the Kashmiri village of Dardpura.

Most recently, Pandit was a co-producer of the 2019 film The Accidental Prime Minister He serves as the president of the Indian Film & Television Directors' Association, and is the chief advisor of (Federation of Western India Cine Employees).

Controversy 

He is known for his controversial statement with regard to the complex issue of Palestine i.e. " Nadav Lapid’s selection as the jury head of IFFI53Goa is a major lapse on behalf of I&B ministry. Hence heads of those in the ministry, who are responsible for this crime, should roll. What does one expect from a Palestine sympathiser?! ". The context was in relation to the Kashmir conflict being portrayed in the [|]] film "The Kashmir Files" by Vivek Agnihotri, whose work has been compared to the works of Leni Reifenstahl.

Filmography

References

External links
 

Living people
Film directors from Mumbai
Hindi-language film directors
20th-century Indian film directors
21st-century Indian film directors
1957 births